Loco fin de semana is a 2019 Mexican comedy film directed by Kristoff Raczyñski. The film premiered on 14 June 2019 in Mexico, and is stars Christian Vázquez as the titular character.

Cast 
 Christian Vázquez as Fede "El Pervertido"
 Oswaldo Zárate as Memo "El Jarioso"
 Alejandra Toussaint as Alejandra
 Giovanna Romo as Pau "La Metiche"
 Juan Pablo Castañeda as Carlos "El Traumas"
 Reynaldo Rossano as Harry "El Exótico"
 Juan Pablo Gil as El Príncipe
 Mauricio Barrientos as El Diablito
 Ricardo Margaleff as El Doc

References

External links 
 

Mexican comedy films
2010s Mexican films